The Estonia men's national 3x3 team is the 3x3 basketball team representing Estonia in international men's competitions, organized and run by the Estonian Basketball Association.

Competitive record

Olympic Games

World Cup

Europe Cup

European Games

Under-18 World Championships

Team

Current roster

References

External links

Official website
FIBA profile

Basketball in Estonia
Basketball
Men's national 3x3 basketball teams